Asterix in Britain ("Asterix in the land of the Britons") is the eighth in the Asterix comic book series. It was published in serial form in Pilote magazine, issues 307–334, in 1965, and in album form in 1966. It tells the story of Asterix and Obelix's journey to Roman-occupied Britain.

Synopsis
Julius Caesar has invaded Britain and succeeded in his conquest; but a single village in Kent remains independent. One member of the village, Anticlimax, is dispatched to Asterix's village to enlist the help of Getafix the druid in providing magic potion for the British rebels. It is decided that Asterix (Anticlimax's first cousin once removed) and Obelix should accompany him, to help transport a barrel of the potion; but while beating up a Roman galley in the English Channel, Obelix mentions the mission, which is reported to the Roman high command in Britain.

In Britain, the barrel containing the potion is confiscated from a pub cellar owned by Dipsomaniax, along with all the barreled "warm beer" (bitter) and wine in Londinium, by the Romans, who set about tasting the barrels to find the right one. Soon the whole unit assigned to the testing is hopelessly drunk; whereupon Asterix and Obelix steal all the barrels labelled with Dipsomaniax's name, but Obelix is himself drunk and starts a fight with some passing Roman soldiers. During the commotion a thief steals the cart with the barrels. Anticlimax and Asterix leave Obelix at Dipsomaniax's pub to sleep off his hangover; but while Anticlimax and Asterix go in search of the thief, the Romans capture the sleeping Obelix and Dipsomaniax, and raze the pub.

In the Tower of Londinium, Obelix wakes up and frees himself and Dipsomaniax out of the jail, and the three heroes, after a search, find the potion in use as a pick-me-up for a rugby team. After this team wins their game, the protagonists seize the potion and escape on the river Thames, where the Romans destroy the barrel and release the potion into the water. At the independent village, Asterix eases the Britons' disappointment by feigning to remake the potion, with herbs Asterix got from Getafix (later revealed to be tea). With a psychological boost, the village prevails against the Romans, and Asterix and Obelix return home to celebrate.

Notes
In both the book and the cartoon, the blue and white uniforms of the Camulodunum team are identical to the modern home kit of Colchester United FC.
The chief of Anticlimax's tribe, Mykingdomforanos (a pun on "my kingdom for a horse"; in French his name is Zebigbos, a pun on "the big boss"), is a caricature of Winston Churchill. The Beatles also make a cameo appearance as bards.
 Although many books in the Asterix series deal with other European peoples, the album's English version formerly contained an unusual note from the authors stating that they do not aim to insult their famous rivals (the English) but to merely make fun of the common stereotypes. The authors would later do likewise (this time in the French edition) in Asterix in Corsica.
In the French version, the Britons speak French using literal translations of English expressions, such as Je dis ! ("I say!"), and placing adjectives before nouns (as is normally done in English) instead of after, as is customary in French. When Anthea Bell and Derek Hockridge translated the story into English, they expressed the linguistic difference between the Gauls and the Britons by having some of the Britons (especially Anticlimax) speak exclusively in stereotypical "upper class" English, including expressions such as "This is a jolly rum thing, eh, what?" and "I say, rather, old fruit". In particular, Anticlimax's frequent use of "what?" makes Obelix ask "What do you keep on saying what for?" to which Anticlimax humorously replies "don't you know what's what, what?"
Anticlimax mentions that the Britons were working on a tunnel under the English Channel. The Channel Tunnel was completed in 1994, 28 years after the book was published.
The city of Londinium was not founded until around 47 AD, about a century after the comic is set.

Adaptations
The book was adapted into an animated film of the same name, which was released in 1986. The adaptation is similar to the book (the main difference being that Dogmatix accompanies his master to Britain).
A second, live-action film was released in 2012. Asterix and Obelix: God Save Britannia follows the plot of the book, but makes several changes: Chief Mykingdomforanos is replaced by the Queen of England and Anticlimax's tribe are represented as Scots in tartan kilts. The story is combined with elements of Asterix and the Normans – not least in that Vitalstatistix's nephew Justforkix accompanies Asterix and Obelix to Britain.
 An audiobook of Asterix in Britain adapted by Anthea Bell and narrated by Willie Rushton was released on EMI Records Listen for Pleasure label in 1987.

In other languages
Originally written in French, Asterix in Britain has been translated into Asturian, Bengali, Bosnian, Breton, Catalan, Croatian, Czech, Danish, Dutch, Finnish, Galician, German, Greek, Hebrew, Hungarian, Icelandic, Italian, Irish, Latin, Norwegian, Polish, Portuguese, Romanian, Scots, Scottish Gaelic, Serbian, Spanish, Swedish, and Welsh.

Reception 
On Goodreads, it had a score of 4.27 out of 5.

References

External links 

Britain, Asterix in
Fiction set in Roman Britain
Works originally published in Pilote
Literature first published in serial form
1966 graphic novels
Works by René Goscinny
Comics by Albert Uderzo
Comics set in the United Kingdom
Depictions of Julius Caesar in comics
Cultural depictions of the Beatles
Cultural depictions of British people
Comics set in London
Ethnic humour